Physalacria is a genus of fungi in the family Physalacriaceae. The genus contains 30 species widely distributed in tropical regions of the Southern Hemisphere.

Species

References

External links

Agaricales genera
Physalacriaceae